Pembela Tanah Air (abbreviated PETA) or  was an Indonesian volunteer army established on 3 October 1943 in Indonesia by the occupying Japanese. The Japanese intended PETA to assist their forces in opposing a possible invasion by the Allies. By the end of the war, there were a total of 69 battalions (daidan) in Java (around 37,000 men) and Sumatra (approximately 20,000 men). On 17 August 1945, the day after the Indonesian Declaration of Independence, the Japanese ordered the PETA daidan to surrender and hand over their weapons, which most of them did. The Indonesian Republic's newly declared President, Sukarno, supported the dissolution rather than turn the organisation into a national army as he feared allegations of collaboration had he allowed a Japanese-created militia to continue to exist.

During the Indonesian National Revolution, former PETA officers and troops, such as Suharto and Sudirman, formed the core of the fledgling Indonesia armed forces.

Structure of PETA

Notable members of PETA 
 Suharto
 Supriyadi
 Sudirman 
 Gatot Soebroto
 Ibrahim Yaacob

See also 
 Pembela Tanah Air Museum
 1945 PETA Revolt in Blitar

References 
 Bachtiar, Harsja W. (1988), Siapa Dia?: Perwira Tinggi Tentara Nasional Indonesia Angkatan Darat (Who is S/He?: Senior Officers of the Indonesian Army), Penerbit Djambatan, Jakarta, 
 Sunhaussen, Ulf (1982) The Road to Power: Indonesian Military Politics 1945-1967 Oxford University Press, 
 Ricklefs, M.C. (1981) A History of Modern Indonesia, c. 1300 to the present. MacMillan,

Notes

Indonesian collaborators with Imperial Japan
Japanese occupation of the Dutch East Indies
Pembela Tanah Air